Jang Chul-Min (Korean: 장철민; born May 19, 1972) is a South Korean former footballer who played as a midfielder.

He started professional career at Jeonbuk Hyundai Motors in 1995, then known as Jeonbuk Dainos and he transferred to Hyundai Horangi in 1997.

He was winner of Top assists award in 1998 Korean League Cup.

References

External links 
 

1972 births
Living people
Association football midfielders
Jeonbuk Hyundai Motors players
Ulsan Hyundai FC players
K League 1 players
South Korean footballers